That Way with Women is a 1947 American comedy film directed by Frederick de Cordova, written by Leo Townsend and Francis Swann, and starring Dane Clark, Martha Vickers, Sydney Greenstreet, Alan Hale, Sr., Craig Stevens and Barbara Brown. It was released by Warner Bros. on March 29, 1947.

The screenplay was adapted from the Saturday Evening Post story "Idle Hands", which was previously the basis for the films The Ruling Passion (1922) and The Millionaire (1931), both of which starred George Arliss in the role assumed by Greenstreet.

Plot
James P. Alden (Sydney Greenstreet), an automobile tycoon who's being pushed to retire, assumes the identity of family gardener Herman Brinker (Alan Hale, Sr.) and, hoping to prove he's still vital, buys a corner gas station with Greg Wilson (Dane Clark), who doesn't know his true identity. This complicates matter when he falls for Alden's daughter Marcia (Martha Vickers). Along the way, the two men also grapple with shakedown artists and numerous false arrests due to mistaken identity.

Cast 

 Dane Clark as Greg Wilson
 Martha Vickers as Marcia Alden
 Sydney Greenstreet as James P. Alden
 Alan Hale, Sr. as Herman Brinker
 Craig Stevens as Carter Andrews
 Barbara Brown as Minerva Alden
 Don McGuire as Slade
 John Ridgely as Sam
 Richard Erdman as Eddie 
 Herbert Anderson as Melvyn Pfeiffer
 Howard Freeman as Dr. Harvey
 Ian Wolfe as L.B. Crandall
 Olaf Hytten as Davis
 Joe Devlin as Police Desk Sergeant
 Clifton Young as Irate Baseball Fan
 Charles Arnt as Harry Miller
 Suzi Crandall as First Party Girl
 Janet Murdoch as Alice Green
 Creighton Hale as Briggs
 Philo McCullough as Hawkins
 Jack Mower as Deacon
 Jane Harker as Angela
 Monte Blue as MacPherson

References

External links 
 
 
 
 

1947 films
1947 comedy films
American black-and-white films
American comedy films
Films based on short fiction
Films directed by Frederick de Cordova
Films scored by Friedrich Hollaender
Warner Bros. films
1940s English-language films
1940s American films